IDEA Office is an American architectural practice based in downtown Los Angeles. It was founded in 1988 by the partnership of Eric A. Kahn and Russell N. Thomsen.

History
Eric A. Kahn and Russell N. Thomsen established their architectural firm in Los Angeles, California in 1988 with a series of theoretical projects and texts about urban and architectural speculations.  They worked in parallel on a series of realized projects including the Brix Restaurant in Marina Del Rey, a series of private residences in Los Angeles and New York City, and the award-winning Y-House in Tokyo, Japan. In 2008, the firm began working on a wider spectrum of projects, including gallery installations in San Francisco and Los Angeles. For the past four years they have been working on a project entitled “Thinking the Future of Auschwitz,” a far-reaching proposal which considers a possible future for the fragile site of Auschwitz-Birkenau.

Founder biographies 

Kahn and Thomsen received their Bachelor of Architecture degrees from California Polytechnic State University, San Luis Obispo, California in 1981, and are registered architects in the State of California. They completed additional studies in Florence, Italy under Cristiano Toraldo di Francia, one of the founders of the architecture office Superstudio.

On completion of their formal education, Kahn and Thomsen worked for the Italian Radical Architecture office Superstudio in Florence, Italy. On his return to the United States, Kahn completed his apprenticeship with Thom Mayne and Michael Rotondi at Morphosis, Architects, and Thomsen with Richard Meier and Partners, Architects, both in Los Angeles. Shortly after establishing their own office in 1988, Kahn and Thomsen were invited to join the faculty at the Southern California Institute of Architecture (SCI-Arc). They are currently senior design studio faculty at the school, teaching studios and seminars in both the graduate and undergraduate programs . Located in downtown Los Angeles, SCI-Arc is ranked as one of the world's top five schools of architecture and design. In addition to teaching at SCI-Arc, they have been visiting professors and held endowed chairs at the University of California Berkeley, the University of Michigan, Taubman College of Architecture and Urban Planning, Kyoto Seika University, Kyoto, Japan, Royal Danish Academy of Fine Arts, Copenhagen, Denmark, Arizona State University, the University of Arkansas and SCI-Arc in Lugano, Switzerland.

Notable Works 

Notable works of IDEA Office includes the donor wall for the Los Angeles Philharmonic Orchestra in the lobby of the Walt Disney Concert Hall, the winning entry in the Dead mall Competition, a new student services building at West Los Angeles College, the VPM prototype for the Dwell Home Invitational. IDEA Office has also completed a series of compelling single-family houses in Los Angeles , New York and Tokyo, such as the Newfield House and the Elysian Park Residence. They were finalists in a housing competition for Livable Places, and the recipient of both the Young Architects Award and the Emerging Voices Lecture Series sponsored by the Architectural League of New York. In 2007, the office received a National American Institute of Architects Education Honor Award for work done in the TOD studio at the University of Arkansas. In 2009, the Y House in Tokyo was awarded first place in the Annual Design Review, Celebrating the Best in American Architecture, sponsored by Architect Magazine. A monograph of their work was published in 1997. Another monograph of recent work entitled, Driven By Dilemma will be published in the fall of 2012. Their work has been exhibited and published internationally, and is part of the permanent collection of the San Francisco Museum of Modern Art.

References

External links 
 Idea Office
 Taubman College Dimension23 Publication
 Sci-Arc Lectures
 Visiting Faculty
 Y House Dwell Publication

Architecture firms based in California
Architects from Los Angeles
Design companies established in 1988
1988 establishments in California